David Pelletier may refer to:
David Pelletier, Canadian pairs figure skater
David Pelletier (American figure skater)
David Pelletier (illustrator)